Bo-yeon is a Korean unisex given name. The meaning differs based on the hanja used to write each syllable of the name. There are 18 hanja with the reading "bo" and 39 hanja with the reading "yeon" on the South Korean government's official list of hanja which may be registered for use in given names.

People with this name include:
Kim Bo-yeon (born 1957 as Kim Bok-soon), South Korean actress
Lee Bo-yeon (born 1982), stage name Lee Si-eon, South Korean actor

See also
List of Korean given names

References

Korean unisex given names